The Lionwolf Series is a fantasy novel trilogy by British writer Tanith Lee, consisting of:
 Cast a Bright Shadow (2005)
 Here In Cold Hell (2006)
 No Flame but Mine (2007)

Series by Tanith Lee
Fantasy novel series
Tor Books books